The Linn County Courthouse in Mound City, Kansas was built in 1885.  It was listed on the National Register of Historic Places in 1974.

It was designed by Topeka architect George Ropes.  It is a two-story-with-basement red brick building with a  plan and height almost .  Its foundation is a native limestone wall, separated from brick above by a smooth cut stone belt course.  A second belt course circles the building at level of the second story's window sills.

See also
Old Linn County Jail, also NRHP-listed in Mound City

References

Government buildings on the National Register of Historic Places in Kansas
Renaissance Revival architecture in Kansas
Government buildings completed in 1885
Linn County, Kansas